Dmitry Tyurin (born 1 October 1958) is a Kazakhstani modern pentathlete. He competed in the men's individual event at the 1996 Summer Olympics.

References

External links
 

1958 births
Living people
Kazakhstani male modern pentathletes
Olympic modern pentathletes of Kazakhstan
Modern pentathletes at the 1996 Summer Olympics
Place of birth missing (living people)
Asian Games medalists in modern pentathlon
Modern pentathletes at the 1994 Asian Games
Asian Games gold medalists for Kazakhstan
Medalists at the 1994 Asian Games
20th-century Kazakhstani people